The  was held in 2014 in Yokohama, Kanagawa, Japan.

Awards
 Best Film: - The Devil's Path
 Best Director: Azuma Morisaki - Pecoross no Haha ni Ai ni Iku
 Yoshimitsu Morita Memorial Best New Director:
 Kazuya Shiraishi - The Devil's Path
 Ryōta Nakano - Capturing Dad
 Best Screenplay: Hirokazu Koreeda - Like Father, Like Son
 Best Cinematographer: Takeshi Hamada - Pecoross no Haha ni Ai ni Iku
 Best Music: Gorō Yasukawa - The Devil's Path, Hello, My Dolly Girlfriend, Amai Muchi, Human Trust, etc...
 Best Actor: Masaharu Fukuyama - Like Father, Like Son and Midsummer's Equation
 Best Actress: Yōko Maki - The Ravine of Goodbye
 Best Supporting Actor: Lily Franky - The Devil's Path and Like Father, Like Son
 Best Supporting Actress:
 Fumi Nikaidō - Why Don't You Play in Hell?, Shijūkunichi no Recipe and Nouotoko
 Makiko Watanabe - Capturing Dad and Daijōbu 3-kumi, etc...
 Best Newcomer:
 Ayaka Miyoshi - Tabidachi no Shimauta: Jūgo no Haru and Good Morning Everyone!
 Gen Hoshino - Why Don't You Play in Hell? and Hakoiri Musuko no Koi
 Haru Kuroki - The Great Passage, Sougen no Isu, Shanidar no Hana, etc...

Best 10
 The Devil's Path
 The Great Passage
 Pecoross no Haha ni Ai ni Iku
 Like Father, Like Son
 A Story of Yonosuke
 The Ravine of Goodbye
 Why Don't You Play in Hell?
 Unforgiven
 The Backwater
 Capturing Dad
runner-up. Koi no Uzu

References

Yokohama Film Festival
Yokohama Film Festival
2014 in Japanese cinema
2014 festivals in Asia